Karishma Mehta is a writer and photographer. She is the founder and manager of the website Humans of Bombay that launched in January 2014, and author of the related book Humans of Bombay. She is also a freelance writer and TEDx presenter.

Biography
Mehta was born and raised in Bombay, and attended the Bombay Scottish School, Mahim. She attended a boarding school in Bangalore for two years and then college in the UK for three years. In 2013, Mehta was an economics and business student in Nottingham, UK, and holds a degree in Business and Economics from the University of Nottingham. She is a freelance writer for various publications, including National Geographic. She has been a regular TEDx presenter, and has spoken several times at the Indian Institute of Foreign Trade. She is fluent in Hindi, English and Marathi.

Works
In January 2014, she began the Humans of Bombay Facebook page, inspired by the Humans of New York (HoNY) Facebook page by photographer Brandon Stanton. After discovering the HoNY page in 2013, she tried to find a similar page for Mumbai, and after not finding one, created a logo and made a Facebook page herself. She initially worked with two interns. To find subjects for the website, Mehta approaches people on the street and asks to take their picture with her camera, and asks them questions. By 2018, her team had expanded to six members based in Mumbai, with freelance members in other parts of India.

Similar to the HONY page, Humans of Bombay has transitioned to its own website, humansofbombay.in. According to Amruta Lakhe, writing for The Hindu in 2016, the website has crowd-funded resources for the subjects of posts, and the "blog made it possible to talk about taboo subjects, and has also allowed people to reach out to one another." Poorvi Joshi of the Hindustan Times writes in 2016, "Mehta's subjects have battled abusive marriages, drug habits, social exclusion. Through her efforts, she has given them a voice." In 2018, Mehta told the Khaleej Times, "we have raised about INR 5 crores not only for acid attack victims but also daughters of sex workers, children who require bone marrow transplants, etc."

In 2016, she compiled posts, including ones that had not been published online, into a self-published book, Humans of Bombay, in her first attempt to directly raise money to fund the website.

As of 2021, the site has over a million followers on Facebook and over two million on Instagram. In 2022, she launched an interview-based YouTube web series called "How The Hell Did I Do It?" which features businesspeople, celebrities, and other accomplished people answering interview questions to provide insight on how they accomplished certain things in their lives.

References

External links
 Almost every photo has a common undertone of Mumbai: Karishma Mehta (Hindustan Times, 2016)

Living people
Year of birth missing (living people)
21st-century Indian women writers
Writers from Mumbai
Indian women photographers
Indian writers
Indian photographers